The 1938 Massachusetts gubernatorial election was held on November 8, 1938.

Former Governor James Michael Curley defeated incumbent Governor Charles F. Hurley in the Democratic primary, but Curley was defeated by former Speaker of the Massachusetts House of Representatives Leverett Saltonstall in the general election. 

Saltonstall's victory returned control of Beacon Hill to the Republicans after an unprecedented eight years of Democratic Governors.

Democratic primary

Governor

Candidates
 James Michael Curley, former Governor, Mayor of Boston, and U.S. Representative
 Charles F. Hurley, incumbent Governor
 Francis E. Kelly, incumbent Lieutenant Governor
 Richard M. Russell, former United States Representative

Results

Lt. Governor

Candidates
James Henry Brennan, former State Senator and Member of the Executive Council
Edward T. Collins, Member of the Executive Council
Alexander F. Sullivan, former State Representative
Joseph C. White, State Senator
William P. Yoerg, Mayor of Holyoke

Results

Republican primary

Governor

Candidates
Frederick Butler, chairman of the Essex County Board of Commissioners and former State Senator
William McMasters, publicity agent for Charles Ponzi and candidate for Governor in 1936
Leverett Saltonstall, former Speaker of the Massachusetts House of Representatives and nominee for Lt. Governor in 1936
Richard Whitcomb, Director of the Boston Survey Commission

Results

Following his loss in the Republican primary, McMasters declared his campaign as an independent on the Townsend Recovery Act line.

Lt. Governor

Candidates
Dewey G. Archambault, Mayor of Lowell
Horace T. Cahill, Speaker of the Massachusetts House of Representatives
J. Watson Flett, Chairman of the Belmont Board of Selectmen
Charles P. Howard, Massachusetts State Commissioner of Administration and Finance
Kenneth D. Johnson, Judge for the Quincy District Court
Robert Gardiner Wilson Jr., Member of the Boston City Council

Results

General election

Candidates
Henning A. Blomen, perennial candidate (Socialist Labor)
Roland S. Bruneau of Cambridge (Independent)
Jeffrey Campbell, black Universalist Unitarian minister (Socialist)
 James Michael Curley, former Governor, Mayor of Boston, and U.S. Representative (Democratic)
William A. Davenport, former State Representative (Independent Tax Reform)
Otis Archer Hood, candidate for Governor in 1936 (Communist)
Charles L. Manser of Boston (Sound, Sensible Government)
William McMasters, publicity agent and whistleblower in the Charles Ponzi case (Townsend Recovery Act)
Leverett Saltonstall, former Speaker of the Massachusetts House of Representatives and nominee for Lt. Governor in 1936 (Republican)
George L. Thompson, former Chairman of the New Hampshire Prohibition Party (Prohibition)

Results

See also
 1937–1938 Massachusetts legislature

References

Bibliography

Governor
1938
Massachusetts
November 1938 events